The Class is a 2007 Estonian drama film directed by Ilmar Raag. Themed on school violence, it was released on March 16, 2007. A 7 episode series was later produced, telling what happens after the initial movie. The series was called Class: Life After (which can also be translated as "Class: For Life").

Plot
Joosep Raak is an Estonian teenager who is being bullied by his entire high school class, the ring leader of them all is Anders, his accomplice Paul, and three other friends: Toomas, Tiit and Olav. Anders encourages the class to continually beat up Joosep, and harass him in other ways as well, such as fully undressing him and then pushing him in the girls' changing room. However classmate Kaspar Kordes decides to go into a matter of loyalty by going against Anders and the others' entertainment of harassing Joosep by defending him, such as giving him a spare pair of shoes when Paul had torn them, which does not sit well with the whole class and so Kaspar becomes separated from the whole group the class had formed. Kaspar's love interest Thea becomes distant to him and this begins to worry him but continues to defend Joosep.

Joosep's teacher Laine becomes aware of Joosep receiving harassment and sends Paul to the headmistresses office and so he frames Kaspar of the whole harassment where they believe in him due to being unaware of his true actions, which leads to the school contacting Joosep's parents. Joosep's Father Margus a militarist fascinated with guns and insists on Joosep being a "real man" encounters him about the accusation of Kaspar bullying him and so Joosep dismissively reveals that is the whole class which angers Margus and tells Joosep to fight the ringleader of the crowd as he believes it is the only way to stop and scare somebody from bullying him. The next day when Anders and his four friends go to attack Joosep, the restrained Kaspar breaks free and attempts to hit Anders with a chair, which Anders manages to dodge. Anders then claims that Kaspar has "gone crazy".

Anders asks Kaspar to meet him in the school playground after class. Upon meeting up with an expected fight, Kaspar tells Anders that he will accept the fact that he will not be a "normal guy", where then Paul, Toomas, Tiit and Olav appear with a restrained Joosep and lock Kaspar in a burned down shed where they force him to watch as they take turns to hit Joosep, to the point where he can't breathe anymore. Before leaving off Anders tells Kaspar that if he continues to defend Joosep then it will only earn Joosep worser beatings. Joosep goes to Kaspar's apartment complex where they meet up and he informs Kaspar that he wishes for him to stop defending him, a concerned Kaspar asks what Joosep will do and suggests that he could shoot them by referencing a God's law, Joosep believes that it will be best if he simply let's it go on until he has completely finished school so he will never see them again and be free.

Thea becomes saddened and angered when the class starts believing that in a homophobic atmosphere Joosep and Kaspar are ridiculed for supposedly having gay feelings for each other and so she is having love interests in Kaspar. Kaspar becomes stressed by this and tries to talk Thea down about it but she starts believing that Kaspar cares more about Joosep then her and leaves him, meanwhile Joosep is being beaten in class.

When returning home, Joosep's Mother Liina discovers heavy bruises on his chest as well as a cut on his chin, she then becomes heavily worried that he had been fighting and demands to know what is happening but he refuses to tell and Margus supports him on the claim. Liina informs the school administration and at last the class as a whole is rightly blamed. When Laine confronts the class about the claim, Joosep runs home fearing the worst and angered, upon entering his home crying only to encounter Margus who learns that Liina called the school, tries to encourage his son to fight back and demonstrates a fighting technique by giving the boy an additional punch.

Out of revenge, the class assembles on a beach, calling both Kaspar and Joosep there by writing emails to them showing each other as fake sender. Once there, they make Thea confess to Kaspar that she is no longer with him in front of the whole crowd which sets him off and beats Anders to the ground only to have a knife pulled on him, they all then force Kaspar to fellate Joosep at knife point and photograph the sexual act without showing the knife. Kaspar throws up afterwards and the class walks away, leaving the two at the beach alone.

The boys decide to avenge themselves. Joosep steals Margus's two pistols, a bolt-action rifle and ammunition from his gun safe whilst asleep, and the two proceed to school the next morning. As they proceed, students and teachers notice the guns in their hands, when a teacher encounters them about it they simply walk past and Joosep tells her to call the police. Before entering the cafeteria to shoot their bullies, Kerli, a gothic girl from the class who also witnessed the incident at the beach, decides to let the two have their revenge and goes past them. They begin the massacre on the students responsible for their torment. Joosep shoots Tiit at close range and then shoots Olav in the head. Joosep then shoots and kills Thea's best friend Riina. To their regret, Kaspar accidentally shoots an eighth grade female student from another class while trying to shoot Anders. Toomas tries to grab the gun from Joosep but ends up getting shot in the abdomen, then Anders and Paul manage to restrain him and take his rifle, however Kaspar saves Joosep by shooting Paul in the head, just before Anders could reach the exit and escape he is shot in the shoulder. Kaspar attempts to shoot him with an empty pistol, but Joosep runs over and executes Anders himself. Joosep then goes over to finish off Thea but Kaspar stops him and decides to spare her. Finally Joosep and Kaspar, facing one another, each aim a gun at their own head, decide to commit suicide together after counting to three. Joosep pulls the trigger and dies, but the film ends with Kaspar still standing there with his gun aiming at his head.

Cast

Critical reception
It currently holds an 89% approval rating among users on Rotten Tomatoes.

Awards
In 2007, The Class received an award from Karlovy Vary International Film Festival and Warsaw International Film Festival. The film was also the official Estonian submission to the Best Foreign Language Film Category of the 80th Academy Awards.

Political invocations
Since the movie was released, one school shooting has taken place in the country. two other school shootings have taken place in nearby Finland — the Jokela school shooting and the Kauhajoki school shooting. In analysis of both events, the movie has been raised as an illustration by columnists and other media pundits.

References

External links

Variety review

2007 films
Estonian drama films
Films about bullying
Films about school violence